The Personal Ensign Stakes is an American Grade I Thoroughbred horse race held annually during the third week of August at Saratoga Race Course in Saratoga Springs, New York. Open to fillies and Mares age three and older, it is contested at a distance of one and one-eighth miles on dirt.

Since 1997, this race has been named for U.S. Racing Hall of Fame filly, Personal Ensign. Undefeated in racing, Personal Ensign was also a great broodmare. Her granddaughter Storm Flag Flying won the race in 2004.

Inaugurated at Jamaica Race Course in 1948 as the Firenze Handicap, it was named for the U.S. Racing Hall of Fame filly, Firenze. From 1986 through 1996 it was run as the John A. Morris Handicap, named to honor John Albert Morris, a prominent horseman who in 1889 built the Morris Park Racecourse in The Bronx, New York.

Since inception, the race has also been hosted by all three tracks operated by the New York Racing Association:
 Jamaica Race Course: 1948–1957
 Aqueduct Racetrack: 1960–1974, 1976–1985
 Belmont Park: 1975
 Saratoga Race Course: 1958–1959, 1986–present

The race has been contested at various distances:
  miles: 1948–1950
 1 mile: 1960–1961
  miles: 1975
  miles: 1976–1994, 2012–present
  miles: 1995–2011

The Firenze Handicap was run on turf from 1972 to 1975 and run in two divisions in 1972 and 1974. The 1988 race was run for purse money only, no wagering, after being postponed for one day due to severe thunderstorms that forced cancellation of the remainder of the racing card at Saratoga Springs on Aug. 28, 1988.

Records
Speed record: 
 2:02.07 – Shadow Cast (2005) (at the distance of  miles)
 1:47.19 – Abel Tasman (2018) (at the current distance of  miles)

Most wins:
 2 – Lie Low (1974, 1975)
 2 – Politely (1967, 1968)
 2 – Beautiful Pleasure (1999, 2000)

Most wins by a jockey:
 8 – Ángel Cordero Jr. (1968, 1972 (2), 1976, 1983, 1985, 1987, 1989)

Most wins by a trainer:
 4 – C. R. McGaughey III (1990, 1995, 2004, 2010)
 4 – MacKenzie Miller (1959, 1974, 1975, 1993)

Most wins by an owner:
 3 – Rokeby Stable (1956, 1969, 1993)
 3 – Ogden Phipps (1980, 1990, 1995) (other members of the Phipps family also won in 1976, 2004 and 2010)

Winners

† The race was run in two divisions in 1972 and 1974.

References

 The 2008 Personal Ensign Stakes at  Thoroughbred Times
 The Personal Ensign at  the NYRA
 Ten Things You Should Know About the Personal Ensign Stakes at Hello Race Fans

Grade 1 stakes races in the United States
Middle distance horse races for fillies and mares
Horse races in New York (state)
Saratoga Race Course
Jamaica Race Course
Recurring sporting events established in 1948
Breeders' Cup Challenge series
1948 establishments in New York (state)